The Sehol A5 Plus  is a compact liftback produced by Sehol of JAC Motors.

Overview

The Sehol A5 Plus was revealed during the 2021 Shanghai Auto Show with sales starting in August 2021. It is the first sedan under the Sehol brand.

Specifications
The A5 Plus is powered by a 1.5 liter TGDI turbo engine code named HFC4GC1.6E shared with the Sehol QX, mated to 7-speed DCT gearbox.

Sehol Aipao (electric variant)
An electric variant based on the A5 Plus originally called the Sehol E50A Pro was also developed and was planned to be launched in 2022. As of March 2022, presales of an updated variant essentially being the final production of the Sehol E50A Pro called the Sehol Aipao (爱跑) was launched with a 64kWh battery set producing a maximum power output of 142kW and 340N·m capable of a top speed of 142km/h and 0-100km/h acceleration takes 7.6 seconds.

References

External links
 JAC Jiayue A5 official website
 JAC iC5 official website

Cars of China
Cars introduced in 2021
Sehol A5 Plus
Front-wheel-drive vehicles
Compact cars
Sedans
2020s cars